HD 73267 is a star in the southern constellation Pyxis, near the western constellation border with Puppis. It has an apparent visual magnitude of 8.889 and can be viewed with a small telescope. The distance to HD 73267 is 164 light years based on parallax, and it is drifting further away with a radial velocity of +51.8 km/s. It has an absolute magnitude of 5.24.

This object is a G-type main-sequence star with a stellar classification of G5V. It is roughly eight billion years old with a near-solar metallicity and is spinning with a projected rotational velocity of 1.65 km/s, giving it a rotation period of around 33 days. The star has 90% of the mass and size of the Sun. It is radiating 78% of the Sun's luminosity from its photosphere at an effective temperature of 5387 K.


Planetary system
In October 2008, a candidate planet was discovered orbiting this star. This object was detected using the radial velocity method by search programs conducted using the HARPS spectrograph. Subsequent analysis of collected data suggests the presence of an additional long-period planet in the system with at least 83% of the mass of Jupiter. In 2022, the inclination and true mass of HD 73267 b were measured, and the presence of a second planet was confirmed using a combination of radial velocity and astrometry.

See also 
 List of extrasolar planets

References

External links
 

G-type main-sequence stars
Planetary systems with one confirmed planet
Pyxis (constellation)
Durchmusterung objects
073267
042202